Dana L. Suskind (born April 7, 1968) is a Professor of Surgery and Pediatrics at the University of Chicago Medical Center (UChicago Medicine); director of UChicago Medicine's Pediatric Hearing Loss and Cochlear Implant program; and founder and co-director of the TMW Center for Early Learning + Public Health at the University of Chicago.

Suskind specializes in early childhood development and has conducted research on parents and caregivers' capacities to drive foundational brain development for children ages birth to three, particularly those born into poverty. Suskind currently serves as a member on the Advisory Council of Too Small to Fail. Suskind has also developed a line of research with celebrated economist John A. List on threats to scalability.  The work uses an economic model to address scale-up effects in public policies.

Education
Suskind received her B.S. from the University of Missouri–Kansas City and her M.D. from the University of Missouri–Kansas City School of Medicine. Suskind completed her residency in otolaryngology head and neck surgery at the Hospital of the University of Pennsylvania, and her fellowship in pediatric otolaryngology at the Children's Hospital of the Washington University School of Medicine in St. Louis.

Career
In 2002, Suskind joined UChicago Medicine as a pediatric otolaryngologist. In 2007, Suskind founded UChicago Medicine's Pediatric Hearing Loss and Cochlear Implant program.

In treating children born with hearing loss across the socioeconomic spectrum, Suskind became increasingly aware of a persistent gap in outcomes among her patient population, as detailed in her popular science book Thirty Million Words. In 2008, Suskind founded Project ASPIRE, a family-centered early intervention program to address this gap and help ensure that all cochlear implant patients receive the rich language exposure implicated in the success of cochlear implantation to reach their full listening and spoken language potential.

In 2010, Suskind broadened her focus beyond her patient population and founded the Thirty Million Words Initiative, a translational research program focused on testing and developing parent-centered interventions to boost early learning outcomes for economically disadvantaged children. In 2013, working with the White House Office of Science and Technology Policy, Suskind and colleagues organized a cross-sector convening entitled "Bridging the Thirty Million Word Gap." In 2015, Suskind's Thirty Million Words: Building a Child's Brain was published by Dutton.

In 2017, Suskind joined with University of Chicago economist John A. List to launch the TMW Center for Early Learning + Public Health at the University of Chicago. In 2018, the TMW Center selected Palm Beach County, Florida as the site of its first community-wide rollout to embed its evidence-based interventions within existing health, education and social service systems.

In 2022, Suskind published Parent Nation: Unlocking Every Child's Potential, Fulfilling Society's Promise. In many ways, Parent Nation is the natural successor to Thirty Million Words: Building a Child's Brain. While Thirty Million Words applies the neuroscience of early childhood brain development to the individual, Parent Nation used that same neuroscience to analyze society as a whole. Suskind argues for a system of robust and comprehensive supports for parents and caregivers. Parent Nation became a New York Times, Wall Street Journal, and USA Today bestseller.

Criticism 
The original Hart and Risley research study upon which Suskind's Thirty Million Words Initiative is based upon has been found to be methodologically flawed, contain ethnocentric bias, and lack a clearly articulated theoretical framework of language and culture. Researchers found that "strong claims about language deficiencies in poor children and their families based on the Hart and Risley study are unwarranted." The original study only analyzed speech between the child and their primary caregiver and did not include language directed at children from other family members and community members, or overheard speech.

Recent research has failed to replicated Hart and Risley's findings.

In 2019, Suskind wrote that she acknowledged the shortcomings of the Hart and Risley study and that there was a need to move beyond the idea of a 30-million-word gap. She explained that the name of her research center at the University of Chicago was changed from “Thirty Million Words” to “The TMW Center for Early Learning + Public Health” to convey “a more evolved and accurate understanding of the science.”

Personal life
Suskind was married to Don Liu from 1995 to 2012. In 2012, Liu, then section chief of pediatric surgery and surgeon-in-chief at UChicago Medicine's Comer Children's Hospital, drowned after attempting to rescue two children who were caught in a strong current in Lake Michigan near the town of Lakeside, Michigan.

In 2018, Suskind married American economist John A. List. The couple resides in the Hyde Park neighborhood of Chicago with their eight children.

Academic publications
Suskind is recognized for her work on early education disparities and parent and caregiver investment, and her research includes over 35 peer-reviewed publications.

Recognition

Suskind's work has been widely covered by the media, including The New York Times, Freakonomics Radio, National Public Radio, The Economist, and Chicago Tribune.

Awards include:
 2018 Alexander Graham Bell Association for the Deaf and Hard of Hearing Chairman's Award
 2018 John D. Arnold, MD Mentor Award for Sustained Excellence from the Pritzker School of Medicine
 2017 Weizmann Women for Science Vision and Impact Award
 2016 Society for Ear, Nose, and Throat Advances in Children (SENTAC) Gray Humanitarian Award
 2015 LENA Research Foundation "Making a Difference" Award

References 

1968 births
Living people
University of Missouri–Kansas City alumni
University of Chicago faculty
American pediatric surgeons
American women physicians
Women surgeons
American women academics
21st-century American women